Mount Galwey is a mountain located north of Blakiston Creek in Waterton Lakes National Park, Alberta, Canada.  The mountain was named in 1934 after Lt. Galwey, who was an astronomer for the International Boundary Commission.


Geology
Like other mountains in Waterton Lakes National Park, Mount Galwey is composed of sedimentary rock laid down during the Precambrian to Jurassic periods. Formed in shallow seas, this sedimentary rock was pushed east and over the top of younger Cretaceous period rock during the Laramide orogeny.

Climate
Based on the Köppen climate classification, Mount Galwey is located in a subarctic climate zone with cold, snowy winters, and mild summers.

See also
Geology of Alberta

References

External links
 National Park Service web site: Waterton Lakes National Park
 Mount Galwey photo: Flickr

Two-thousanders of Alberta
Canadian Rockies